Vaghatur is a village in the Tegh Municipality of the Syunik Province in Armenia.

Toponymy 
The village was previously known as Bayandur, a tribal name which originates from Bayandur tribe of Oghuz Turks.

Demographics

Population 
The Statistical Committee of Armenia reported its population was 476 in 2010, up from 458 at the 2001 census.

References 

Populated places in Syunik Province